Burns Lake (LD Air) Water Aerodrome  is located on Burns Lake  south southeast of Burns Lake, British Columbia, Canada.

See also
Burns Lake Airport

References

Seaplane bases in British Columbia
Regional District of Bulkley-Nechako
Registered aerodromes in British Columbia